The Series ALFA Steel is a series of Czech-made revolvers designed for sport shooting and personal defense needs, and for users who favor the .32 S&W and .38 special cartridges. The ALFA Series Steel is part of the three revolver series made by ALFA: Series ALFA, Series ALFA Steel, and Series HOLEK. All the Series ALFA Steel revolvers have blued finishes, and the only four models not to have a chrome finish are the four Sport models.

Models
The Series ALFA Steel revolver models can be broken down into five groups (by caliber):
.22 WMR Models, .22 LR Models, .32 S&W Models, .38 Special, and 9mm luger Models. Each caliber has varied cylinder capacities.

.22 WMR

.22 LR

.32 S&W

.38 Special

9mm luger

 9mm luger cartridge needs shorter cylinder so barrels are longer approximately by 9mm to reach the cylinder

See also
ALFA Combat
ALFA Defender
List of firearms
Series ALFA

References
 Product Page for .22 LR and .22 WMR Models
 Product Page for .32 S&W and .38 Special Models
 Product Page for 9mm luger Models (czech language) 

Revolvers of Czechoslovakia
.22 LR revolvers
Revolvers